This article contains books written by or about Narendra Modi.

Books by Narendra Modi

Books on Narendra Modi
Satish Kumar, Bibhuti bBiswas(2016). Modi cultural diplomacy and soft power. New Delhi: INDU BOOK SERVICES. 

 
 
 
 
 
 
 
 
 
 
 
 
 
 
 
 
 
 
 

Narendra Modi
Cultural depictions of Narendra Modi
Narendra Modi-related lists
Books about Hindutva
Indian non-fiction books
Books about Indian politicians
Books about the Modi administration
English-language books
Books about Narendra Modi